Ben Blain (born 16 September 1988) is a professional rugby union referee who represents the Scottish Rugby Union.

Rugby union career

Playing career

Amateur career

Blain played with Carlisle RFC as a scrum-half.

Referee career

Professional career

Blain began refereeing with Cumbria Referee Society. By 2015 he was refereeing local English matches in National League 1. and Academy matches for the English Premiership.

In 2016, Blain joined the Scottish Rugby Union to be part of their referee group. He is now a member of the Borders Referee Society. He was promoted to the Elite SRU refereeing panel in 2017.

He now referees in the Scottish Premiership.

He has now refereed in the Pro14. He made his debut in the Dragons v Munster match in January 2019.

He has also refereed in the European Challenge Cup.

Blain refereed his first Super 6 match on 14 December 2019 when the Ayrshire Bulls played Stirling County.

He refereed his first 1872 Cup match on 21 December 2019.

International career

Blain refereed the Belgium v Georgia in March 2019.

Blain has been picked as Assistant Referee for International matches.

He has also refereed in U20 Six Nations matches.

Outside of rugby

Blain is a chartered surveyor and has a degree in Estate Management from Northumbria University.

References

Living people
Scottish rugby union referees
Rugby union officials
1988 births
United Rugby Championship referees
Super 6 referees
1872 Cup referees